Esther Sanz (born 6 December 1974) is a Spanish badminton player, born in Málaga. She competed in women's singles at the 1992 Summer Olympics in Barcelona.

References

External links
 

1974 births
Living people
Spanish female badminton players
Olympic badminton players of Spain
Badminton players at the 1992 Summer Olympics
Sportspeople from Málaga